Strangers' Hall is a museum of domestic history located in Norwich, Norfolk, UK. It is a Grade I listed building.

The oldest parts of the building date back to the fourteenth century, although many additions have been made to the structure over its hundreds of years of use.

Although Strangers' Hall has been the home of many varied members of society, including a solicitor and a dance master, it is most notable as the residence of numerous Mayors of Norwich, having first served this purpose in 1340.

References

External links

 Norfolk Museums page

Historic house museums in Norfolk
Museums in Norwich
Mayors of Norwich
Buildings and structures in Norwich
Grade I listed buildings in Norfolk